Andrea Molinelli (born 6 May 1993) is an Italian footballer who plays for Romanese Calcio.

Career
Born in Castel San Giovanni, the Province of Piacenza, Emilia region, Molinelli started his career at Piacenza. He received a call-up to Christmas Youth Tournament from Italian Football Federation (FIGC) in December 2007. In January 2011 he was signed by Serie A club Genoa in temporary deal. However Molinelli only able to play in the reserve team. In August 2011 the loan was extended.

Livorno
In summer 2012 Piacenza was bankrupted; Molinelli was signed by Livorno on free transfer that summer, despite the transfer also cost Livorno €30,000 as agent fee. Molinelli signed a four-year contract. On 25 August 2012 Molinelli made his Serie B debut against Juve Stabia. He was substituted at half time by Emerson.

South Tyrol
On 11 July 2013 he was signed by South Tyrol in co-ownership deal for €30,000. On 31 January 2014 he was signed by Gubbio, with Cocuzza and Traoré moved to opposite direction via Parma. On 14 June 2014 Livorno bought back Molinelli from South Tyrol.

Return to Livorno
Molinelli wore no.15 shirt for Livorno in 2014–15 Serie B. By February 2015, he had not played any game in the whole season.

References

External links
 Lega Serie B profile 

Italian footballers
Piacenza Calcio 1919 players
Genoa C.F.C. players
U.S. Livorno 1915 players
F.C. Südtirol players
A.S. Gubbio 1910 players
Serie B players
Association football midfielders
Sportspeople from the Province of Piacenza
Footballers from Emilia-Romagna
1993 births
Living people